Datu Mama Bago (1770 – March 15, 1850) was the Datu of Davao Gulf from 1800 till his death 1850, serving as vassal under the Sultanate of Maguindanao. Aside from being known to have conquered most of the Davao Gulf area for his domain in the early 1800s, he was also known for his dogged resistance against the Spanish Empire who went on to conquer his capital settlement of Pinagurasan, now present-day Davao City. He remains a local hero in Davao City for his military exploits, being officially made a historical hero by the City Government of Davao in 2018.

References

1770 births
1850 deaths
Filipino datus, rajas and sultans
Filipino Muslims
Filipino people of Malay descent
People of Spanish colonial Philippines
Paramilitary Filipinos
19th-century monarchs in Asia